The Cenia River is a river in the provinces of Castellón and Tarragona, Spain It begins its course at  in the Barranc del Salt, Ports de Beseit limestone massif near La Pobla de Benifassà.

The Cenia River flows from west to east marking the historical limits between Catalonia (Montsià) and the Valencian Community (Baix Maestrat). It ends its course in the Mediterranean Sea at Sòl de Riu., between Vinaròs and Alcanar municipalities. Its flow is highly irregular. Some years its riverbed remains dry during the whole stretch of its lower course.

The Ulldecona Dam is a dam built across three tributaries of the Sénia river in the Tinença de Benifassà area.

Tributaries
 From the left:
 Barranc dels Terrers:

See also 
La Sénia
 List of rivers of Spain
Taula del Sénia
Tinença de Benifassà

References

External links
Small dam at Sant Joan del Pas 
Flood prevention 

Rivers of Spain
Rivers of the Valencian Community
Rivers of Catalonia